Solar Max may refer to:
 The solar maximum period of greatest sunspot activity in the 11 year solar cycle of the Sun
 The Solar Maximum Mission satellite to investigate solar phenomena